Pau Brasil is a municipality in the state of Bahia in the North-East region of Brazil.

Teva King of Pau's
List of municipalities in Bahia

References

Municipalities in Bahia